The 1915 Miami Redskins football team was an American football team that represented Miami University as a member of the Ohio Athletic Conference (OAC) during the 1915 college football season. Led by coach Chester J. Roberts in his first year, Miami compiled a 6–2 record.

Schedule

References

Miami
Miami RedHawks football seasons
Miami Redskins football